The Cedar Canyon Bridge is a steel arch highway bridge on US 60 near Show Low, Arizona. The  bridge was substantially widened and upgraded in 1994, using the identical arch from the Corduroy Creek Bridge to double the width of the bridge while rehabilitating the deck structure.

See also

List of bridges documented by the Historic American Engineering Record in Arizona
List of bridges on the National Register of Historic Places in Arizona
National Register of Historic Places listings in Navajo County, Arizona

References

External links

Arizona DOT page on bridge widening
Bridge widening project

Open-spandrel deck arch bridges in the United States
Buildings and structures in Navajo County, Arizona
Steel bridges in the United States
Bridges completed in 1938
Road bridges on the National Register of Historic Places in Arizona
National Register of Historic Places in Navajo County, Arizona
Transportation in Navajo County, Arizona
Historic American Engineering Record in Arizona
U.S. Route 60
Bridges of the United States Numbered Highway System
Girder bridges in the United States